The Napoleon Opening is an irregular chess opening starting with the moves:
1. e4 e5
2. Qf3

As with the similar Danvers Opening (2.Qh5), White hopes for the Scholar's mate (2...Nc6 3.Bc4 Bc5 4.Qxf7), but Black can easily avoid the attack.

History
The Napoleon Opening is named after the French general and emperor Napoleon Bonaparte, who had a deep love of chess but was said to be a mediocre player. The name came into use after mid-nineteenth century publications reported that he played this opening in an 1809 game that he lost to The Turk, a fake chess automaton operated at the time by Johann Allgaier.

Assessment
The Napoleon is a weak opening because it  the white queen prematurely and subjects it to attack, and deprives the white  of its best development square.

See also
 List of chess openings
 List of chess openings named after people

References

External links
Napoleon vs. The Turk, Schönbrunn Palace, 1809

Chess openings
Napoleon